The Bihar Legislative Assembly, also known as the Bihar Vidhan Sabha, is the lower house of the Bihar Legislature where the first elections were held in 1952.

The total strength of membership in the Assembly was 331, including one nominated member. Shri Krishna Singh became the first Leader of the House and the first Chief Minister, Anugrah Narayan Singh was elected as the first Deputy Leader of the Assembly and became state's first Deputy Chief Minister. The number of members was reduced to 318 during the second general elections. In 1977, the total number of elected members of the Bihar Legislative Assembly was raised from 318 to 325.

With the creation of a separate State of Jharkhand, by an act of Parliament known as the Bihar Reorganisation Act, the strength of the Bihar Legislative Assembly was reduced from 325 to 243 members. Out of those 243 seats, 38 are reserved for Scheduled Castes and 2 are reserved for Scheduled Tribes.

History

After the passing of the Government of India Act 1935, Bihar and Orissa became separate states. A bicameral system of legislature was introduced according to the act. In 22 July 1936, first Bihar legislative council was set up. It had 30 members and Rajiv Ranjan Prasad was the chairman. First joint session of the two houses of the Bihar Assembly took place in 22 July 1937. Ram Dayalu Singh was elected as the speaker of the Bihar Assembly.

Bihar Legislative Assembly terms

Following are the dates of constitution and dissolution of the Bihar Legislative Assembly. First sitting date and date of completion of term for each Vidhan Sabha can be different from the constitution and dissolution dates (respectively).

Working
The Bihar Legislative Assembly is not a permanent body and is subject to dissolution. The tenure of the Legislative Assembly is five years from the date appointed for its first sitting unless dissolved sooner. Members of the Legislative Assembly are directly elected by the people.

There are three sessions (Budget session, Monsoon session, Winter session) every year.

The Sessions of Legislative Assembly are presided by Speaker and The Speaker certifies that whether a bill is ordinary bill or money bill. Generally he does not participate in voting but he casts his vote in the case of tie. Awadh Bihari Chaudhary is the current Speaker of Bihar Legislative Assembly. The Legislative Assembly also has a Secretariat which is headed by Secretary. He is under the disciplinary control of Speaker. The function of Secretary is to assist the Speaker. Bateshwar Nath Pandey is the current Secretary of Bihar Legislative Assembly.

Composition

Members of Legislative Assembly

See also
 Bihar Legislative Council
 Government of Bihar
 Patna Secretariat
 List of constituencies of the Bihar Legislative Assembly
 List of governors of Bihar
 List of chief ministers of Bihar
 List of deputy chief ministers of Bihar
 List of leaders of the opposition in the Bihar Legislative Assembly

References

External links
 Official website ; Government of Bihar

 
State lower houses in India